Cardo is a Spanish television series created by Ana Rujas and Claudia Costafreda for Atresmedia Televisión. It was produced by Atresmedia Televisión in collaboration with Buendía Estudios and Suma Latina. It premiered on Atresplayer Premium on 7 November 2021.

Premise 
The fiction, primarily set in Carabanchel, consists of a story displaying "costumbrista" themes, also underpinning an outline of the conditions of the urban precariat. It follows María, a woman close to the 30s hooked on drugs and toxic relationships. She has decided to help Puri, a 65-year-old woman whose floristry shop is about to close down. María then suffers a motorbike accident.

Cast

Production and release 
Based on an original idea by Ana Rujas, Cardo was created by Rujas together with Claudia Costafreda. Montse García, Sonia Martínez, Amparo Miralles and Javier Calvo and Javier Ambrossi ("Los Javis") were credited as executive producers. Consisting of 6 episodes, the series was directed by Claudia Costafreda. Shooting began in June 2021 and it took place in Madrid.

The series was presented on 24 September 2021 at the 69th San Sebastián International Film Festival, with the pre-screening of the first three episodes. It is slated for a 7 November 2021 premiere date.

In December 2021, Atresmedia reported the renovation of the series for a second season. Season 2's episodes 1 and 2 premiered on 12 February 2023.

Accolades 

|-
| align ="center" rowspan ="3" | 2022 || rowspan ="3"| 9th Feroz Awards || colspan ="2" | Best Drama Series ||  || rowspan="3" | 
|-
| Best Actress (TV series) || Ana Rujas ||  
|-
| Best Supporting Actress (TV series) || Yolanda Ramos || 
|-
| align = "center" | 2023 || 31st Actors and Actresses Union Awards || Best Television Actress in a Leading Role || Ana Rujas ||  || 
|}

References 

Spanish-language television shows
Atresplayer Premium original programming
Television shows set in Madrid
Television shows filmed in Spain
Television series by Buendía Estudios
2021 Spanish television series debuts
2020s Spanish drama television series
Urban fiction